Maya Miriga (English The Mirage) is a 1984 award-winning Odia film directed by Nirad N. Mohapatra.

Story
The story is of a family, where three generations live under a decaying roof. The widowed grandmother is the titular head, her son Raj Kishore Babu, father of four sons and a daughter, is the gentle yet disciplined headmaster on the verge of retirement. The father demands of his sons a diligent pursuit of education as the means of upward mobility. The centre of all their hopes is the brilliant second son studying in Delhi to get into the Indian Administrative Service. When he is admitted to the IAS, the family thinks all their sacrifices have been worth it.

The family receives flattering marriage proposals and the IAS probationer marries a city-bred girl above his status. Unvoiced protest comes from the eldest daughter-in-law Prabha,  beast of burden and kitchen slave. Her husband is a college lecturer. Prabha wonders if the IAS officer's wife will share the chores. She is proved right when the new bahu defies tradition by opting to stay with her parents when the husband is away on training. She takes her dowry of a new fridge and furniture to her independent home, causing strong resentment in Prabha. She nudges her husband towards independence and he opts to be deputed to Cuttack. The bewildered patriarch seeks consolation in stoic acceptance of these changes, ruminating over the younger generation's break for independence on his walks with a friend who waits for his America-based son. His is not the Shakespearean tragedy of a Lear — he is too dispassionate for that. But in his very real hurt, he has the comfort of memories to fall back upon just as his two older sons have their future to look forward to. The youngest son, the rebel whose passion is cricket, not only manages to get a first class but shames the IAS brother into financing his higher studies in Delhi. It is the timid third son whose second division in the all-important exam strands him in the backwaters of mediocrity, with a sense of being a failure and conscious of his father's disappointment.

Cast
 Kishori Devi  - Raj Kishore's wife
 Sampad Mahapatra   -Tutu
 Manaswini Mangaraj - Prabha
 Manimala
 Binod Misra -  Tuku
 Bansidhar Satpathy - Raj Kishore
 Sujata Mahapatra  -Tutu's Wife
 Bibekananda Satpathy
 Shriranjan Mohanty
 Tikina

Review
The director's muted sympathy for the one who stays back gives Maya Miriga its poignant austerity. The gentleness of the unfolding and the contemplative insights offered into each individual's feelings and motives, the naturalistic mise en scene enveloped in shadowy sepia tones imbue a familiar, ordinary tale of Indian life with melancholy poetry.

Awards & Participation 
 Cannes film festival (1984) -Critics Week Section  
Mannheim-Heidelberg International Film festival - Best Third World Film (1984)
Regus London Film Festival (28th)
National Film Awards (1984) - Second Best Feature Film
Los Angeles Film Festival
Odisha State Film Awards (1985) -Best Director, Best Film
Locarno Film Festival/  festival di Locarno
Hawaii Film Festival - Special Jury Commendation

References

External links
Maya Miriga  at Letterboxd

1984 films
Indian drama films
1984 drama films
Second Best Feature Film National Film Award winners
1980s Odia-language films
National Film Development Corporation of India films